MQTT is an ISO standard (ISO/IEC PRF 20922) publish–subscribe-based messaging protocol. It works on top of the Internet protocol suite TCP/IP. It is designed for connections with remote locations where a "small code footprint" is required or the network bandwidth is limited. The publish-subscribe messaging pattern requires a message broker.

All comparison categories use the stable version of each implementation listed in the overview section. The comparison is limited to features that relate to the MQTT protocol.

Overview 
The following table lists MQTT both libraries and implementations, along with general information about each.

A more complete list of MQTT implementations can be found on GitHub.

Protocol support 

There are several versions of the MQTT protocol currently standardized. Below is a list containing the more recent versions of the MQTT protocol, with the organization that standardized them.

 MQTT-SN v1.2, standardized by IBM.
 MQTT v3.1, standardized by Eurotech and IBM.
 MQTT v3.1.1, standardized by OASIS.
 MQTT v5.0, standardized by OASIS.

The following table lists the versions of MQTT that each implementation supports, and also lists their support for SSL/TLS and TCP. The security provided by SSL/TLS may be desirable depending on the type traffic being sent between devices, as MQTT transmits messages in the clear.

Quality of service levels offered 

From the MQTT page, quality of service (QoS) is described as,Quality of service refers to traffic prioritization and resource reservation control mechanisms rather than the achieved service quality. Quality of service is the ability to provide different priority to different applications, users, or data flows, or to guarantee a certain level of performance to a data flow.A description of each QoS level is found below.
 At most once delivery (fire and forget)
 At least once delivery (acknowledged delivery)
 Exactly once delivery (assured delivery)

The following table lists each implementation's support of the QoS levels.

Portability concerns 
Portability concerns in this section refers to technical details that may be deciding factors in selecting an implementation to use. In general, this table should be used by those with more knowledge about the device they will be using.

General requirements 

The following table shows various requirements that may be useful when deciding on which implementation to use for a device.

References

Data transmission
MQ
Network protocols
Telemetry
Time series software
Application layer protocols
Message-oriented middleware
MQTT implementations